NGC 6027 is a lenticular galaxy discovered by Édouard Stephan in 1882 that is the brightest member of Seyfert's Sextet, a compact group of galaxies.

See also 
 NGC 6027a
 NGC 6027b
 NGC 6027c
 NGC 6027d
 NGC 6027e
 Seyfert's Sextet

References

External links 
 
 

Lenticular galaxies
10116 NED01
56575
6027
Serpens (constellation)